Raden Adipati Aria Sulaeman Sastrawinata (27 February 1869 – 16 June 1951) was a Sundanese aristocrat and the regent of Ciamis under the Dutch East Indies from 1914 to 1935.

Early life 
Sastrawinata was born in Purwakarta, West Java. He had been the chief prosecutor in Serang.

Regent of Ciamis 

Sastrawinata was appointed regent in 1914, replacing the retiring Raden Adipati Aria Kusumabrata of Galuh.  In 1916, he changed the name of Galuh to Ciamis, a move that brought disapproval among many residents.

Death 
Sastrawinata died on 16 June 1951.

Marriages and children 
Sastrawinata's first marriage was to Mojanegara, whom he married in 1896. She died of dysentery and did not bear him any children, but they adopted a niece and nephew from Purwakarta. When she was seeking treatment from Dutch doctors in Garut, she became fond of a local girls' school teacher named Suhaemi, who was 15 years old at the time. Prior to her death, Mojanegara asked her husband to marry Suhaemi, and the two were married in 1916. Despite being the daughter of a wealthy landowner, Suhaemi was not of noble birth, so she could not become Sastraningrat's official wife and take the title of Raden Ayu. In 1919, he married Kancananingrat, the widowed daughter of the regent of Sumedang, and she became his Raden Ayu.

Ten days before Sastrawinata's marriage to Kancananingrat, Suhaemi gave birth to his first child, a daughter whom he named Kurnia, meaning gift. Suhaemi's second child, a son, was born in 1924, and two more daughters were born in 1932 and 1934.

References

Citations

Bibliography 

 
 
 
 

1869 births
1951 deaths
19th-century Dutch East Indies people
20th-century Dutch East Indies people
Politicians from the Dutch East Indies
Priyayi
Sundanese people